Mobility 2030 is the regional transportation plan released in 2003/2004 for the Metro Atlanta, Georgia region.  It was developed by the Atlanta Regional Commission and includes projected population growths and possible transportation improvements.

The majority of the transit plan calls for the construction of additional roads, with some improvements and expansion in public transportation.  The plan was developed to address the transit needs for Atlanta for the next 20 years while also minimizing traffic congestion and air pollution.  

Critics of the plan have complained that the plan does not provide solutions to limit urban sprawl, decrease traffic congestion, or significantly expand public transit, bicycle and pedestrian options.  Funding for MARTA projects is also limited; the transportation plan calls for the use of bus rapid transit (BRT) in some areas instead of light or heavy rail.

References

External links
Atlanta Regional Commission
Mobility 2030 Brochure

Transportation in Atlanta